1999 in philosophy

Events 
 John Rawls was awarded the Rolf Schock Prize in Logic and Philosophy from the Royal Swedish Academy of Sciences "for his book "A Theory of Justice", which has constituted a renewal of normative ethics and political philosophy and has in an essential way contributed to the methodology for normative ethics."

Publications 
 Ian Hacking, The Social Construction of What? (1999)
 Tim Berners-Lee, Weaving the Web (1999)

Deaths 
 February 8 - Iris Murdoch (born 1919)
 June 20 - Clifton Fadiman (born 1904)

References 

Philosophy
20th-century philosophy
Philosophy by year